Selebi-Phikwe Airport  is an airport serving Selebi-Phikwe, a town in the Central District of Botswana. Both the town and airport names are sometimes given as Selebi Phikwe.

The Selebi Phikwe non-directional beacon (Ident: SP) is located on the field.

It is also near the gateway of the Tuli Block area, where wildlife and resorts are popular. No scheduled services currently operate at the airport. Private and charter traffic serve the airport.

See also

Transport in Botswana
List of airports in Botswana

References

External links
OpenStreetMap - Selebi Phikwe
OurAirports - Selebi Phikwe
SkyVector - Selebi-Phikwe

Airports in Botswana
Central District (Botswana)